Annahita Le Loc’h Zamanian Bakhtiari (born 19 February 1998) is a professional footballer who plays as a midfielder for Serie A club Fiorentina, on loan from Juventus. Born in England to an Iranian father and a French mother, Zamanian holds both British and French citizenship; she has represented France internationally at youth level.

Early and personal life
Zamanian was born in London to an Iranian father and French mother from Brittany, and moved to Sweden when she was four years old. Despite living most of her life in Sweden, she does not have a Swedish passport. She holds French and British citizenships. She has played for the French U-16 and U-17 teams.

Zamanian is fluent in English, French, Persian, Swedish, and Italian.

Club career
Zamanian started her senior career representing Göteborgs DFF. After playing for Kopparbergs/Göteborg in the Damallsvenskan, Zamanian began playing for Paris Saint-Germain in 2018. She has featured for PSG in the 2018–19 UEFA Women's Champions League knockout phase.

On 2 January 2020, Zamanian joined Serie A champions Juventus. She renewed her contract in June 2020 after a successful start in the season, which included a goal in her debut match on 12 January 2020. On 25 June 2020, Juventus became league champions.

In January 2023, Zamanian joined Fiorentina on loan until the end of the season. She made her debut for Fiorentina on 28 January 2023 against Pomigliano and scored her first goal for the club in the following match against Sampdoria while being subsequently named in the league's team of the week for her performance.

International career

Youth
Zamanian played for the France women's national under-20 football team at the 2018 FIFA U-20 Women's World Cup.

Club statistics

Honours
Juventus
 Serie A: 2019–20, 2020–21, 2021–22
 Coppa Italia: 
 Supercoppa Italiana: 2020–21, 2021–22

References

External links 
 
 
 
 
 

1998 births
Living people
French women's footballers
Damallsvenskan players
Division 1 Féminine players
Serie A (women's football) players
BK Häcken FF players
Paris Saint-Germain Féminine players
Juventus F.C. (women) players
Fiorentina Women's F.C. players
French expatriate footballers
French expatriate sportspeople in Sweden
Expatriate women's footballers in Sweden
Expatriate women's footballers in Italy
French people of Iranian descent
Sportspeople of Iranian descent
British emigrants to Sweden
Footballers from Greater London
English women's footballers
English people of Iranian descent
English people of French descent
English people of Breton descent
English expatriate women's footballers
English expatriate sportspeople in Sweden
English expatriate sportspeople in Italy
Women's association football midfielders
France women's youth international footballers